James Raymond Hurford, FBA (born 16 July 1941) is a linguist and academic.

He is the General Editor of the book series Oxford Studies in the Evolution of Language, as well as a member of the Centre for Language Evolution (formerly Language Evolution and Computation) research group at the University of Edinburgh where he is an emeritus professor.

He also helps organize the series of International Conferences on the Evolution of Language

Hurford was elected a Fellow of the British Academy in 2015.

Publications
 2014 The Origins of Language: A Slim Guide
 2011 The Origins of Grammar: Language in the Light of Evolution
 2007 The Origins of Meaning: Language in the Light of Evolution
 1994 Grammar: a Student's Guide
 1987 Language and Number: the emergence of a cognitive system
 1983 Semantics: a Coursebook
 1975 The Linguistic Theory of Numerals

As Editor:
 2000 The Evolutionary Emergence of Language: Social function and the origins of linguistic form, edited by Chris Knight, Michael Studdert-Kennedy and James R Hurford
 1998 Approaches to the Evolution of Language: social and cognitive bases, edited by James R Hurford, Michael Studdert-Kennedy and Chris Knight.

References 

Living people
Linguists from the United Kingdom
Academics of the University of Edinburgh
Fellows of the British Academy
1941 births
People associated with The Institute for Cultural Research
Philosophers of linguistics